Fatimih Dávila Sosa (1 February 1988 – 2 May 2019) was a Uruguayan model and beauty queen who was the winner of Miss Universo Uruguay 2006, where she represented Punta del Este. Since she won the national pageant, she travelled to Los Angeles, USA to represent Uruguay in the 2006 Miss Universe pageant, which was held on 23 July 2006.

Life

Model career 
She also represented her country in Reina Sudamericana 2006 (finalist), Miss Model of the World 2006 (semifinalist), Miss Continente Americano 2006 (First-runner up) and Miss World 2008 in Johannesburg, South Africa, on 13 December 2008.

TV career 
Dávila had also a supporting role in the Mexican Telenovelas El triunfo del amor on El Universal and Soy tu dueña on Televisa.

Personal life 
She lived in Las Condes from 2006 to 2011, and Santiago de Chile and later in Ciudad De Mexico.

Death 
On 2 May 2019, Dávila was found dead at a hotel in Colonia Nápoles, Mexico City.

References

External links

1988 births
2019 deaths
People from Punta del Este
Miss Universe 2006 contestants
Miss World 2008 delegates
Uruguayan beauty pageant winners
People murdered in Mexico
Uruguayan people murdered abroad